Darkest Hour is the eighth album by American metal band Darkest Hour. It was released on August 5, 2014, through Sumerian Records. It is the first album to feature bassist Aaron Deal and drummer Travis Orbin. The album marks their significant departure from their usual melodic death metal sound, instead having a more mainstream approach with elements of metalcore more prominent, with a more upbeat style.  The band's next release would see a return to their original style.

Track listing

Digital Deluxe Edition track listing

Personnel
Darkest Hour
 John Henry – vocals
 Mike Schleibaum – rhythm guitar
 Mike "Lonestar" Carrigan – lead guitar
 Aaron Deal – bass
 Travis Orbin – drums, percussion

Additional musicians
 Dræmings – additional vocals on "By the Starlight"

References

Darkest Hour (band) albums
2014 albums
Sumerian Records albums